The Society for Anthropological Sciences (SASci) is a scholarly association formed in 2004 to promote the development of empirical theory and methods in anthropology.

Origin
The impetus for forming the SASci lay in changes that have occurred in the American Anthropological Association (AAA).  The AAA, founded in 1902, is the largest professional organization for anthropologists in the world.  It was founded as a scientific society and was so regarded by most of its membership for most of its history.  Nominally, it still is one.  In recent years, however, a substantial portion of its membership has rejected the idea that anthropology can be or should be a science.  At the same time, the AAA has grown numerically and reorganized.  Instead of a single decision-making body it has become an association of constituent societies, called “sections” and "interest groups."  In the process it has delegated to sections control over the portions of the annual meetings that fall within their respective areas of substantive interest.  One consequence of these changes has been that many anthropologists whose methods are more clearly those of the physical sciences have dropped away and either formed or joined independent scientific societies, such as the American Association of Physical Anthropologists and Society for American Archaeology.  Another consequence was that in 2004 a substantial group of more scientifically oriented panels that had been proposed for the annual meetings of the AAA was rejected for lack of an interested section.  It then became clear to many who remained in the AAA that while there were organized bodies arguing strongly against scientific methods and values, there was no equivalent voice dedicated to arguing for them.  This SASci was then formed to argue for the pro-science position within the American Anthropological Association and to create a bridge between the American Anthropological Association and anthropologists and others outside of it who shared their concerns.

Purpose
The stated objective of the SASci is to advance the scientific study of human societies through scholarly meetings, publications, and related activities.  The SASci also advances the dissemination of anthropological knowledge within the scientific community, to other educators, and to the broader general public.  The SASci encourages active student participation and facilitates student incorporation into the professional research community.

Within the AAA, the present status of the Society for Anthropological Sciences is that it is a section. The acronym for this group is SAS.  SASci also incorporated as an independent, non-profit, scholarly and educational association.  Non members of the AAA belong to the latter organization only. AAA members have dual membership.

Activities
The SASci sponsors or engages in four main activities.

It maintains a website at http://www.societyforanthropologicalsciences.org.  The purpose of the site is promote discussion and cooperation among anthropologists and others interested in promoting scientific anthropology, as  opposed to those who argue that anthropology (and social science generally) is not scientific, cannot be scientific, or should not be scientific.  The site promotes relevant conferences and meetings, provides links to useful scientific resources, provides links to teaching materials, and provides forms that can be used to join SASci and to register and propose panels for panels at the conferences organized by SASci itself.
In association with its website, the SASci also maintains a listserve to facilitate discussion among members on the same issues and concerns, and help members organize cooperative research.
The SASci sponsors annual meetings for interested persons on relevant themes and organize panels for such meetings.  The first such conference was held in New Orleans, LA, 22–23 November 2004.  The second was Santa Fe, NM, in 23 February 2005-February 27, 2005, and the third was in Savannah, GA, on February 22-February 25, 2006.  The second and third were held in conjunction with the Society for Cross Cultural Anthropology, which is older and larger and has been doing this for some years.  Financially, they are self-liquidating.  Conference fees have covered the costs, with small amount left over, but they are not fundraising activities.
SAS/SASci sponsor the H. Russell Bernard Graduate Student Paper Awards at both the American Anthropological Association meetings in the autumn and the annual spring meetings. This prize goes to the best paper submitted and presented at the meetings that reflects the highest standards in empirical anthropology. The prize is named in honour of one of the founding members of SAS, H. Russell Bernard, who has provided both inspiration and tuition for generations of scientific and humanistic anthropologists.
The SASci promotes or facilitates the organization by its members of panels at the Annual Meetings of the American Anthropological Association.
In the American Anthropological Association, the SASci presently has the status of a provisional "section".  Its title is the Section for Anthropological Sciences (SAS). Membership just prior to being granted status as a provisional section was over 500.

External links
 Society for Anthropological Sciences Website

Anthropology-related professional associations